This is a list of notable Finnish philosophers:

A
Elisa Aaltola
Erik Ahlman
Timo Airaksinen
Lilli Alanen

B
Otto Brusiin

E
Hjalmar Magnus Eklund

F
Arvi Grotenfelt

H
Arto Haapala
Pekka Himanen
Jaakko Hintikka
Matti Häyry

K
Eino Kaila
Raili Kauppi
S. Albert Kivinen
Tarja Knuuttila

L
Gunnar Landtman
Pentti Linkola

M
Uskali Mäki

N
Ilkka Niiniluoto

P
Paavo Pylkkänen
Pauli Pylkkö

R
Yrjö Reenpää

S
Esa Saarinen
Juha Sihvola
Johan Vilhelm Snellman

T
Raimo Tuomela
Jouko Turkka

V
Juha Varto

W
Thomas Wallgren
Edvard Westermarck
Georg Henrik von Wright

 
Finnish
Philosophers